Ilias Louka (born 23 July 1974) is a retired Cypriot shot putter. His brother Mikhalis Louka was also a shot putter.

He finished sixth at the 1992 World Junior Championships and won the silver medal at the 1993 European Junior Championships. He competed at the 1996 Olympic Games without reaching the final. He became visiting Greek shot put champion in 1993 and 1996.

His personal best throw was 19.54 metres, achieved in 1996.

References

1974 births
Living people
Cypriot male shot putters
Olympic athletes of Cyprus
Athletes (track and field) at the 1996 Summer Olympics
Commonwealth Games competitors for Cyprus
Athletes (track and field) at the 1990 Commonwealth Games
Athletes (track and field) at the 1994 Commonwealth Games
Athletes (track and field) at the 1998 Commonwealth Games
Athletes (track and field) at the 1991 Mediterranean Games
Athletes (track and field) at the 1993 Mediterranean Games
Greek Cypriot people
Mediterranean Games competitors for Cyprus